Satyapal Anand (born April 24, 1931) is an Indian-American poet, critic and writer. He has written several fictional and poetry books in four languages: English, Urdu, Hindi and Punjabi. He has also received awards for his literary work.

Personal life 

Anand was born in Kot Sarang, Chakwal district, now in Pakistan. He finished his primary education there and attended secondary school in Rawalpindi in 1947. After the partition of India, his family moved to Ludhiana in East Punjab, where he received his college education, earning a Masters in English from the Punjab University in Chandigarh with academic distinction. Later, he earned his first doctoral degree in English Literature with a thesis titled "Changing concept of the nature of reality and literary techniques of expression." He earned his second doctoral degree in Philosophy from the Trinity University, Texas.

Anand married Promila Anand in November 1957 and the couple had two sons (Pramod and Sachin) and a daughter (Daisy).

Career

Academic

Anand has spent most of his life in teaching graduate and post-graduate students in universities around the globe. Starting with the Punjab University in Chandigarh in 1961, he has held teaching positions at other universities, including the University of District of Columbia (UDC) in Washington, DC. He has also been a visiting professor at South Eastern University in Washington, D.C., University of British Columbia, Vancouver, Canada, and Open University in England. From 1992–95 he was on special assignment as a Professor of Education in the Department of Technical Education, Saudi Arabia. He has availed many invitations in his professorship life, having nickname "Air Port Professor" by his pupils and friends. He visited several countries including UK, Germany, Turkey, Denmark, Norway and North America.

Literary

Anand's writing career started in the early 50s when in a span of just two years he published a poetry collection, a collection of stories, and novels, all in Urdu. He had his brush with authorities when the Government of Punjab, India banned his Hindi novel "Chowk Ghanta Ghar" in 1957 and ordered his arrest. His first book of short stories was published in 1953, when he was a 22-year young student. He has been highly praised by the Urdu writers and poets for his best literary work in Urdu, Punjabi, Hindi and English. He mostly writes poems rather than ghazals. His poems are based on history, mythology or mixed culture of the West and the East.

Anand's English poem "Thus Spake The Fish" has qualified for the award in an international competition by UN sponsored committee for "Earth Preservation Day Celebration." The poem,

Awards 

 Jawaharlal Nehru Fellowship for his book Promises to Keep; Ahmad Adaya
 Urdu Markaz Award, Los Angeles
 Shiromani Sahityakar Award by the Government of Punjab, India

Bibliography 

Short stories
 Jeeney Key Liye
 Apney Markaz Ki Taraf
 Dil Ki Basti
 Apni Apni Zanjeer
 Patthar Ki Saleeb

Novels
 Aahat
 Chowk Ghanta Ghar
 Ishq Maut Aur Zindagi
 Shehr Ka Ek Din

Urdu poetry
 Dast e Barg
 Waqt La Waqt
 Aaney Wali Sahar Band Khirki Hai
 Lahu Bolta Hai
 Mustaqbil aa Mujh Se Mil
 Aakhri Chattan Tak
 Mujhay Kar Vida
 Mere Andar Ek Samandar
 Meri Muntakhab Nazmen
 Byaz e Umr

Books in Hindi
 Yug Ki Awaz
 Painter Bawrie
 Azadi Ki Pukar, Bhoori
 Dil Ki Basti
 Chowk Ghanta Ghar
 Geet Aur Ghazles
 Ghazlon Ka Guldasta
 
In Punjabi

 Saver Dopeher Shaam
 Makhu Mittha
 Ghazal Ghazal Darya
 Ghazal Ghazal Sagar
 Ghazal Ghazal Leher
 Rajneetak Chetana Ate Sutantarta Sangraam

In English

 The Dream Weaver
 A Vagrant Mirror
 One Hundred Buddhas
 If Winter Comes
 Sunset Strands
 Some shallow, some deep
 Life's a tale

See also
 List of Urdu language writers
 List of Urdu language poets

References

External links
 Book Review
 Sunset Strands (digitaal boek)
 Satyapal Anand products
 All books by Satyapal Anand
 Fourth Independence Day Bilingual Poetry Recitation in Washington
 Mushaira-Kavi Sammelan in US

1931 births
Living people
Urdu-language poets
English-language poets from India
Hindi-language poets
Punjabi-language poets
Jawaharlal Nehru Fellows
People from Chakwal District
Indian emigrants to the United States